Rachel Rath (born 2 October 1976, Gorey, County Wexford, Ireland) is an Irish film, television and theatre actress.

She has appeared in the films The Actors (2003), Laws of Attraction (2004), Ella Enchanted (2004) and Anton (2007). She has worked on a number of occasions with novelist and playwright Irvine Welsh, including starring in the European premiere of his play Babylon Heights and featuring in his short film directorial debut Nuts.

She also appeared in three feature films for Robbie Moffat: Cycle (2005), Axe Raiders (2005), and Dark Side of Heaven (2006). She founded 'The Attic Studio' with director Graham Cantwell in 2003, a network of Irish-based actors, writers and directors.

Filmography
 Anton (2007) Detective Byrne
 The League of Gentlemen's Apocalypse (2005) Homunculus
 Ella Enchanted (2004) Moss the Elf
 Laws of Attraction (2004) Chambermaid
 The Actors (2003) Actor in Richard III

Television series and guest spots
 Bachelors Walk (2003) - Waitress

References

External links

 Rachel Rath Official website

Living people
Irish film actresses
Irish television actresses
Irish stage actresses
1976 births